Sandy is the surname of:

 Casey Sandy (born 1984), Canadian gymnast
 Gary Sandy (born 1945), American actor best known for playing Andy Travis on the sitcom W.K.R.P. in Cincinnati
 Isabelle Sandy (1884–1975), French poet and writer
 Jamie Sandy (born 1963), Australian rugby league footballer who played in the 1980s
 Kurnia Sandy (born 1975), Indonesian retired football goalkeeper
 Mark Sandy, US government official
 Marco Sandy (born 1971), Brazilian former footballer
 Michael Sandy (1977–2006), African-American targeted for robbery because he was gay; fatally struck by a car while attempting to escape

See also
 Sandys (surname)